Kenneth A. Fuchsman is an American scholar, professor emeritus in the anthropology department at the University of Connecticut, where he taught American history and interdisciplinary studies. From 2016 to 2020 he was president of the International Psychohistorical Association. He has written on US presidents John F. Kennedy, Richard Nixon, Barack Obama and Donald Trump.

Selected publications

 (Co-editor)

References

External links
Ken Fuchsman: Semantic Scholar

Year of birth missing (living people)
Living people
21st-century American non-fiction writers
University of Connecticut faculty
American historians